Paolo Hospital Kaset, formerly Mayo Hospital, is a private hospital on Phahonyothin Road in Chatuchak District in Bangkok, Thailand.

References

External links
 Hospital Kaset satellite map of hospital

Hospitals in Bangkok
Hospitals established in 1978
Chatuchak district
1978 establishments in Thailand
Private hospitals in Thailand